2007 Indoor Hockey World Cup may refer to:

2007 Men's Indoor Hockey World Cup
2007 Women's Indoor Hockey World Cup